The Roddenbery Memorial Library (RML) is a single branch public library system serving county of Grady, located in Georgia. The library is located in Cairo, Georgia.

RML is a member of PINES, a program of the Georgia Public Library Service that covers 53 library systems in 143 counties of Georgia. Any resident in a PINES supported library system has access to the system's collection of 10.6 million books. The library is also serviced by GALILEO, a program of the University System of Georgia which stands for "GeorgiA LIbrary LEarning Online". This program offers residents in supported libraries access to over 100 databases indexing thousands of periodicals and scholarly journals. It also boasts over 10,000 journal titles in full text.

History

The Roddenbery Memorial Library had its beginning in January 1939 when it was established as the Cairo Public Library. The initial housing for the first building was the second floor of City Hall.

In 1964 the library was granted a new building on North Broad Street in Cairo, as a gift from the Roddenbery Family to the community. With the gift of a new building the library name was changed in honor of the family.

Since the library's founding in 1939 it has won the John Cotton Dana Award twice, in 1950 and 1960. This award is considered the most prestigious of all American Library Association awards in the field of public relations and marketing.

Library systems in neighboring counties
De Soto Trail Regional Library System to the north.
Thomas County Public Library System to the east.
Southwest Georgia Regional Library to the west.

References

External links
PINES Catalog

County library systems in Georgia (U.S. state)
Public libraries in Georgia (U.S. state)
Buildings and structures in Grady County, Georgia